Oreini (Frashtani) is a village and a former community in the Serres regional unit, Greece. Since the 2011 local government reform it is part of the municipality Serres, of which it is a municipal unit. The municipal unit has an area of 54.309 km2. Population 742 (2011).

Northeast of the modern village (approximately 2 km), on the hill of "Prophet Helias", the site of a Roman settlement has been identified.

His foundation, dating back to early antiquity, is associated with the rich iron mines of mountain Vrontous, as is evidenced by the discovery of an iron smelter side the ruins of a Roman castle, located 3–4 km east of the hill of "Prophet Helias".

The ruins of Banitsa, a formerly Bulgarian inhabited village abandoned in 1913, are also nearby.

See also
List of settlements in the Serres regional unit

References

Populated places in Serres (regional unit)
Archaeological sites in Macedonia (Greece)